Stone Deaf Forever! is a 5-CD box set collection by the band Motörhead, released in 2003.

Recording
Stone Deaf Forever! is the first fully comprehensive box set collection covering the band's career from 1975 to 2002 and is the first box set to be issued with full band approval: the track listing was compiled in association with the band and its fan club.

The accompanying 60-page booklet contains a new 12,000-word essay by rock journalist Mick Wall and previously unpublished photos and information. Also included is a full colour replica tour poster and a Motörhead button. The cover art features a newly commissioned painting by longtime Motörhead artist Joe Petagno.

Nineteen tracks made their CD debut on this set, although a number have since been included on Motörhead reissues and most significantly the BBC Live & In-Session set.

Track listing

Personnel
Lemmy (Ian Kilmister) – bass guitar, lead vocals
Larry Wallis – guitar (track 1.2)
"Fast" Eddie Clarke – guitar (tracks 1.3–2.9)
Brian "Robbo" Robertson – guitar (tracks 2.10–2.12)
Phil "Wizzö" Campbell – guitar (tracks 2.13–4.16)
Würzel (Michael Burston) – guitar (tracks 2.13–3.18)
Lucas Fox – drums (track 1.2)
Phil "Philthy Animal" Taylor – drums (tracks 1.2–2.12, 3.1–3.7)
Pete Gill – drums (tracks 2.13–2.21)
Tommy Aldridge – drums (tracks 3.8–3.10)
Mikkey Dee – drums (tracks 3.11–4.16)

Motörhead compilation albums
2003 compilation albums